was a village located in Minamiaizu District, Fukushima Prefecture, Japan.

As of 2003, the village had an estimated population of 1,812 and a density of 11.83 persons per km². The total area was 153.13 km².

On March 20, 2006, Ina, was merged with town of Tajima, and the villages of Nangō and Tateiwa (all from Minamiaizu District), was merged to create the town of Minamiaizu.

External links
 Minamiaizu official website 

Dissolved municipalities of Fukushima Prefecture
Minamiaizu, Fukushima